Marana  is a Syrian village located in Markaz Rif Dimashq District, Rif Dimashq. According to the Syria Central Bureau of Statistics (CBS), Marana had a population of 1,176 in the 2004 census. To its north is Kawkab and the 100th division base, to its south is Muqaylibah and al-Taybah, to its east is al-Kiswah, and to its west is Deir Khabiyah and Zakiyah.

References 

Populated places in Markaz Rif Dimashq District